The Minister of Crown Investments was a cabinet position in Manitoba, Canada. The position was started by the government of Howard Pawley in 1982, and discontinued by the incoming government of Gary Filmon in 1988.

List of Ministers of Crown Investments

References 

1982 establishments in Manitoba
1988 disestablishments in Manitoba
Investment in Canada
Crown Investments, Minister of